Crapper is slang term for a toilet.

It may also refer to:

 Caganer ( "the crapper"), a figurine depicted in the act of defecation appearing in nativity scenes in Catalonia
 Thomas Crapper, an English plumber and holder of patents on toilets (baptised 28 September 1836; died 27 January 1910) 
 Frank Crapper (1911–1991), Australian footballer
 Fred Crapper (1909–1976), Australian footballer
 Harry Crapper (1905–1976), Australian footballer
 Thomas Crapper (1836–1910), British plumber